The Esperanto Wikipedia (or  ) is the Esperanto version of Wikipedia, which was started on 11 May 2001, alongside the Basque Wikipedia. With over  articles , it is the -largest Wikipedia as measured by the number of articles, and the largest Wikipedia in a constructed language.

Origin and influence of the Esperanto Wikipedia 
Chuck Smith, an American Esperantist, is considered to be Esperanto Wikipedia's founder. Later on, he undertook a journey to Europe with the goal of popularizing Wikipedia among the speakers of Esperanto in European countries. For instance, in November 2002 he gave a talk about Wikipedia at the 10th Conference on the Application of Esperanto in Science and Technology in Dobřichovice (Czech Republic).

Esperanto speakers have also been involved in the founding of several other language versions of Wikipedia (Czech, Slovak, Ossetian, Swahili). The introduction of support for the Esperanto alphabet by Brion Vibber, an Esperanto speaker and later Wikimedia Foundation's first employee, in January 2002 has paved the way for alphabets of languages other than English and initiated the transition of the whole Wikipedia to Unicode.

Quality of the Esperanto Wikipedia 

As of January 2022, the Esperanto Wikipedia has 309 articles of feature quality and a further 279 considered worth reading. Weekly community projects include a Collaboration of the Week which improves neglected articles and an Article of the Week featuring good-quality articles on the front page. The Esperanto community is a frequent contributor to the Meta project, Translation of the week.

According to the List of Wikipedias by sample of articles at Meta, a list based on List of articles every Wikipedia should have, Esperanto ranks 36th, lacking almost none of the list of vital articles, but having in general relatively short articles.

On 18 November 2008, the Esperanto Wikipedia implemented the Flagged Revisions extension.

As of February 2012, the Esperanto Wikipedia had the 5th greatest number of articles per speaker among Wikipedias with over 100,000 articles, and ranked 11th overall. These figures were based on Ethnologues estimate of 2,000,000 Esperanto speakers.

Due to the geographical spread of its editors (see the box on the right), the Esperanto Wikipedia has a varied list of countries of origin of its editors.

On 13 August 2014, Esperanto Wikipedia reached 200,000 articles.

Notability within the Esperanto community 

At least three editors are members of the Academy of Esperanto: Gerrit Berveling, John C. Wells, and Bertilo Wennergren, a notable Esperanto grammarian and the director of the Academy's section about Esperanto vocabulary.

 incorporates, with permission, the content of the 1934  and also content from several reference books and the monthly periodical .

The Esperanto Wikimania, a gathering held in 2011 to celebrate the encyclopedia's 10th anniversary, has been subsidized by the host city of Svitavy (Czech Republic) and the Pardubice Region and covered by Czech Television.

Esperanto organisations like Universal Esperanto Association do not contribute to  but support it by providing chambers at Esperanto conventions for  presentations and trainings. At the World Esperanto Congress in Rotterdam, summer 2008, there were two Wikipedian meetups and a lecture at the Esperantology Conference. In April 2013, ELiSo (Esperanto and Free Knowledge) was established as one of the first Wikimedia user groups.

Wikipedia handbook in Esperanto 
The Esperanto Wikipedia community has created and published a 40-page Wikipedia: Practical Handbook, which is sold online and at conventions. The manual is intended to give new Wikipedians advice and information on how to edit Wikipedia in Esperanto. It is currently in its second printing.

Gallery

See also

 Esperanto
 Esperanto literature

References

External links

Esperanto Wikipedia 
Esperanto Wikipedia mobile version 
Manual at Vikilibroj (Wikibooks) 
Report at Libera Folio, March 2008 
Clip at Youtube.com 

Wikipedias by language
Wikipedia
Wikipedia
Esperanto encyclopedias
Internet properties established in 2001